Walter Enright may refer to:
 Walter J. Enright, American cartoonist
 Walter John Enright, Australian solicitor and amateur anthropologist